Bloomfield Hills High School (BHHS) is a public high school in Bloomfield Township, Michigan, United States. It is the sole comprehensive high school of the Bloomfield Hills School District, and was established in 2013 when the district merged Andover and Lahser High Schools.

History 
In 2010, the Bloomfield Hills School Board began discussing a move to merge Andover and Lahser High schools and build a new high school that would reside on Andover's grounds.  The plan included provisions for Lahser's athletic facilities to be kept for use by the new high school.  
In fall of 2015, students transferred from the two main campuses to a new building known as BHHS. The neighboring Model Center was built as the replacement for the Model High School, which was part of Bloomfield Hills Schools district.

As part of a 2020 passed bond proposal, new infrastructure will be installed within the school including enhanced security, upgraded network and wireless capabilities, and turf baseball and softball fields.

Extracurricular activities

Athletics

The following sports are supported during the fall, winter, and spring seasons.

Fall sports:

- Boys' soccer
- Boys' tennis
- Cross country
- Equestrian
- Football
- Girls' golf
- Girls' swimming and diving
- Poms
- Volleyball

Winter sports:

- Boys' basketball
- Bowling
- Boys' hockey
- Boys' swimming and diving
- Figure skating
- Girls' basketball
- Girls' hockey
- Gymnastics
- Skiing
- Wrestling

Spring sports:

- Boys' baseball
- Boys' golf
- Boys' lacrosse
- Girls' lacrosse
- Girls' soccer
- Girls' tennis
- Softball
- Track and field

Additionally, BHHS first fielded a school ESports team in the 2022 spring season.

Student Life 
The Hawkeye, BHHS's school newspaper, has won several awards at the state level for print journalism. Additionally, the paper regularly operates a website.

BHHS offers over 50 clubs, alliances, and student groups for students to participate in at the extracurricular level.

Notable alumni 
 Yante Maten, NBA G League player

References

External links 
 

Bloomfield Hills, Michigan
Schools in Bloomfield Township, Oakland County, Michigan
High schools in Oakland County, Michigan
Public high schools in Michigan
Educational institutions established in 2013
2013 establishments in Michigan